The 1999–2000 Midland Football Combination season was the 63rd in the history of Midland Football Combination, a football competition in England.

Premier Division

The Premier Division featured 17 clubs which competed in the division last season, along with three new clubs:
Blackheath Electrodrives, promoted from Division One
Northfield Town, promoted from Division One
Nuneaton Griff, joined from the Coventry Alliance Football League

Also:
GPT Coventry changed name to Marconi

League table

References

1999–2000
9